Uroleptus musculus is a species of ciliates.

Description
The organism is either white or rose-coloured. The collar extends from ventral files, that extends a short distance along the right side of the body. The body is also elongated and has a tail-like portion, that has 3 frontals and 2-4 rows of ventral cirri. It has no transverse cirri. The oral area is not U-shaped.

References

Species described in 1786
Spirotrichea